Mo So is a village in the Hpruso Township of Kayah State, Myanmar. Mo so is the primary village in the Mo So village tract and is located west of Hpruso on the Hpruso-Mo So-Hoyar Road.

On 24 December 2021, Myanmar Army carried out an alleged massacre against civilians near the village.

References 

Populated places in Kayah State